The Swiss diaspora refers to Swiss people living abroad, also referred to as "fifth Switzerland", alluding to the fourfold linguistic division within the country. The Federal Department of Foreign Affairs (FDFA) cares for Swiss people living abroad.

Fifth Switzerland Communication 
The FDFA provides four different ways of communication with Swiss people abroad. These services include: Voting and electoral right, Consular services, Organization of the Swiss Abroad (OSA) and the Swiss Revue 

The service "Itineris" provided by the FDFA is available to all Swiss abroad.

Swiss expatriate regions
 As of 31 December 2016, a total of 774,923 Swiss citizens (Swiss abroad) (+ 21,784 compared to 2015) were registered as living abroad. For reference, in 2007, a total of 668,107 Swiss citizens (10.0%) were registered as living abroad.
 A majority (71.5%) held dual citizenship; vast majority of these had citizenship of another European Economic Area country, namely and primarily France, Germany, Belgium, Italy or the United Kingdom or were citizens of United States, Canada, Australia or New Zealand. Swiss Jews form a small group in Israel.

The statistics below are: 
 all taken from the 31 December 2016 statistics 
 the 2015 data is shown in brackets
 +/- indicates the amount by which the figure has increased or decreased compared to the previous year; the previous's year's figure is shown immediately after.

Overall 
 787,968 Swiss abroad
 The data used comes from the 2021 statistics is provided by the Federal Department of Foreign Affairs.
The following ten countries have the highest populations of Swiss abroad:

Africa
The following five countries have Africa's highest populations of Swiss abroad:

Asia
 53,184 (+2,204, 51,610) Swiss abroad
The following five countries have Asia's highest populations of Swiss abroad:

Brunei
Suzanne Rahaman Aeby (b. 1954 Freibourg), a former nurse, is the mother of Pengiran Anak Sarah, the wife of Brunei's Crown Prince, Al-Muhtadee Billah.

China 
 1,714 Swiss abroad

Hong Kong 
 2,275 Swiss abroad

Philippines
 3,623 Swiss abroad

Sri Lanka
The Schweizerischer Hülfsverein in Ceylon was founded on 15 September 1933. In the beginning, its main purpose was to provide assistance to Swiss citizens in need. In 1956, the Swiss Circle Colombo was established to promote social activities among Swiss nationals in Ceylon. It is now known as Swiss Circle Sri Lanka.

Europe 
 482,194 (+14,530, 467,664) Swiss abroad

Albania 
 76 Swiss abroad

Austria 
 16,602 Swiss abroad

France

 200,730 Swiss abroad

The largest number of Swiss immigrants arrived in France between the 1850s and the 1930s. Many of them settled in Alsace and in the cities of Paris, Marseille and Lyon.

Germany 
 94,000 Swiss abroad

Italy 
 51,895 Swiss abroad

Portugal
 4,713 Swiss abroad

Russia

Significant emigration of Swiss people to the Russian Empire occurred from the late 17th to the late 19th century. The late 18th and early 19th century saw a flow of Swiss farmers forming colonies such as Şaba (Bessarabia, at the Dniester Liman, now part of Ukraine). The Russian-Swiss generally prospered, partly merging with German diaspora populations. As at the end of 2016, 776 Swiss citizens live in Russia.

Spain 
 25,168 Swiss abroad

Sweden 

Swiss people in Sweden are people who are registered in Sweden and who originate in Switzerland. According to Statistics Sweden, in 2017 there were a total of approximately 3,900 people born in Switzerland including Swedish citizens of Swiss descent.

United Kingdom 
 34,971 Swiss abroad

North America

Canada
 40,280 Swiss abroad

Mexico
 5,489 Swiss abroad

Antigua and Barbuda
 36 Swiss abroad (2019)

United States
 81,075 Swiss abroad

The first Swiss person in what is now the territory of the United States was Theobald von Erlach (1541–1565). Before the year 1820 some estimated 25,000 to 30,000 Swiss entered British North America. Most of them settled in what is now Pennsylvania, as well as North and South Carolina.

Most Swiss preferred the rural villages of the Midwest and the Pacific Coast, where Italian-speaking Swiss played a significant role in California's winegrowing culture. Swiss immigration diminished after 1930 because of the Great Depression and World War II.

In 1999 New Glarus, Wisconsin was chosen as the future home of the Swiss Center of North America, a cultural center dedicated to the preservation and celebration of Swiss culture. New Glarus was chosen because of its central location and the large concentration of Swiss Americans in the vicinity.  Funds for the centre came from the United States Department of Housing and Urban Development, the State of Wisconsin, the Canton of Glarus, and corporations, including General Casualty Insurance, Nestlé USA, Novartis, Phillip Morris Europe, and Victorinox.

Oceania 
 32,316 (+664, 31,652)

Australia
 25,148 Swiss abroad
Over 20,000 people of Swiss origin live in Australia.

New Zealand 
 6,925 Swiss abroad

South America

Argentina
 15,816 Swiss abroad

By 1940, some 44,000 Swiss had emigrated to Argentina, settling mainly in the provinces of Córdoba and Santa Fe, and to a lesser extent, in Buenos Aires. In 1856 the colony farm of Esperanza was founded in Santa Fe becoming the mother of agricultural colonies in Argentina, and thus beginning a long process of European colonization and immigration on Argentine soil. Current  estimates state 150,000 Swiss descendants residing in Argentina.

Brazil 
 15,321 Swiss abroad
 Up to 500,000 Swiss descendants. 

The history of Swiss immigration to Brazil began with the foundation of the colony of Nova Friburgo in 1819. Nova Friburgo was the first colonial company contracted by the Portuguese government. The immigrant colonists wrote letters for publication in Swiss newspapers of the period, and these documents reveal the migrants' perceptions, information and expectations. 

On 4 July 1819 1,088 Swiss, including 830 from the Canton of Fribourg, departed from Estavayer-le-Lac on Lake Neuchâtel. They included Jean-Claude Marchon, his wife Marie Prostasie Chavannaz Marchon, his brother Antoine Marchon and fiancée Marieanne Elizabeth Clerc. They travelled first to Basle, the meeting point of the Swiss Transmigration for Brasil. And then 2.000 Swiss, by the Rhein River, go to Holland and after a lot of peripetia they depart from St. Gravendeel, near Dordrecht, in the Daphne, for the crossing of the Atlantic Ocean, on September 11. Their arrival in Rio de Janeiro was on November 4, spending 55 days, a very good time for the epoch. And, finally, they arrive in Morro-Queimado (Burnt Mount) on November 15, 1819 – about 12000 kilometers in 105 days, approximately 114 kilometers a day.

Chile 
 5,366 Swiss abroad
 Between 90,000 to 100,000 descendants.

The percentage of Swiss in Chile is small, despite having a relatively large number of members. This is because their linguistic and cultural characteristics are commonly confused with Germans, Italians and French. Swiss migration to Chile took place at the end of the nineteenth century, between 1883 and 1900, particularly in the area of Araucanía, especially in Victoria and Traiguén. It is estimated that more than 8,000 families received grants of land.

Between April 1876 and May 1877 a contingent of Swiss immigrants comprising 119 families came to the area of Magallanes (Punta Arenas and Fresh Water), mostly peasants from the canton of Fribourg.

Later, during the period from 1915 to 1950, was the last recorded mass exodus of Swiss to Chile. 30,000 people settled in the central area of the country, primarily in Santiago and Valparaíso. There are currently 5,000 Swiss citizens residing in Chile and between 90,000 to 100,000 Swiss descendants.

Colombia 

 2,627 Swiss abroad

Uruguay

Venezuela 
 1,449 Swiss abroad
Joaquin Ritz and Melchor Grubel arrived in Venezuela in 1529 and 1535 respectively - the first Swiss who came to South America. As of 2009,  1,900 Swiss citizens lived in Venezuela.

Ancestry 
Self-reported Swiss ancestry or partial ancestry:

See also
Foreign relations of Switzerland
Swiss people
Demographics of Switzerland
Immigration to Switzerland
News service for Swiss abroad from SWI swissinfo.ch

References